Water resistance may refer to:

 The WR mark on a wristwatch indicating its ability to withstand exposure to water
 The IP code on a mechanical or electrical enclosure indicating its ability to resist the ingress of water
 Wet strength, a measure of the strength of paper when wet
 Waterproofing, making objects or structures resist the ingress of water under specified conditions
 Fluid resistance, drag in water
 Lotus effect (water-resistance in plant leaves)
 The electrical resistivity of water (0.2 Ω·m sea water, 2 to 200 Ω·m drinking water, 180000 Ω·m deionized water at 20°C)

See also:
 Hydrophobe
 Superhydrophobe